Perry is a city in Houston and Peach counties in the U.S. state of Georgia. It is the county seat of Houston County. The population was 13,839 at the 2010 census, up from 9,602 at the 2000 census. As of 2019 the estimated population was 17,894. It is part of the Warner Robins, Georgia Metropolitan Statistical Area, within the Macon–Bibb County–Warner Robins Combined Statistical Area.

Perry is best known as the location of the annual Georgia National Fair.

History
Founded in 1823 as "Wattsville", the town was located near the center of Houston County and served as its courthouse. The name was soon changed to honor Commodore Oliver Hazard Perry, a hero of the War of 1812. The Georgia General Assembly incorporated the town on December 9, 1824. The original city limit was a circle, one mile in diameter, except where bounded on the north by Big Indian Creek.

Antebellum industry in Perry included gristmills, sawmills, and cotton gins. The Houston Home Journal began publishing in 1870. Cotton was the most significant commodity crop in the 20th century.

Tourism has been important to the local economy since about 1920, when U.S. Highway 41 to Florida was paved. The New Perry Hotel, built in 1870 and rebuilt in 1925, became a landmark for many Florida tourists. The downtown area has emphasized its historic heritage and has several quaint shops and restaurants.

Since World War II, when Robins Air Force Base was established in nearby Warner Robins, the military has been a significant employer in the area. Warner Robins is several times larger than Perry. Other manufacturers in the city have included Frito-Lay, Perdue Farms (formally Heileman Brewing Co.), and Cemex, Inc. (formally Penn-Dixie Cement and Medusa Cement Company).

In the early 1960s Interstate 75 was constructed through the western side of the city. It has attracted more businesses that cater to travelers. The Georgia National Fairgrounds and Agricenter opened in 1990. The Go Fish Georgia Education Center opened October 8, 2010.

Geography
Perry is located in west-central Houston County at  (32.464940, −83.721163). The city limits extend northwest into Peach County. It is on Big Indian Creek, a tributary of the Ocmulgee River.

U.S. Highway 41 passes through the center of Perry, leading north  to Macon and south  to Unadilla. Interstate 75, the major north-south artery through Georgia, passes through the western side of Perry, with access from Exits 134 through 138. I-75 leads north  to Atlanta and south  to Valdosta. U.S. Highway 341 also passes through Perry, leading northwest  to Fort Valley and southeast  to Hawkinsville.

Airport
The Perry-Houston County Airport serves Middle Georgia's general aviation needs with a 5,000' x 100' runway, hangar space, a repair/maintenance facility, flight school, and both aviation and jet fuel services.  Presently the facility is the base for 89 aircraft, with 66 public and corporate hangars.

Culture

Georgia National Fair 
The Georgia National Fair is a state-sponsored fair that is held every October at the Georgia National Fairgrounds and Agricenter in the southern part of Perry. The fair is an 11-day event offering a wide range of activities and shows, such as agricultural, livestock and horse shows, home and fine arts competitions, youth organization events (4-H, FBLA, FCCLA, FFA, and TSA), circus, midway rides, and games, fair food, major live music concerts in Reaves Arena, family entertainment, and nightly fireworks.

Go Fish Education Center 
The Go Fish Education Center takes visitors on an educational journey through Georgia's watersheds to learn about the diverse aquatic wildlife, their natural habitats and the impact of water pollution. Visitors can see freshwater aquariums, explore underwater habitats, view aquatic wildlife, catch fish in a stocked pond, view a movie exploring Georgia's fishing options and traditions, and try out interactive fishing and boating simulators. The Go Fish Education Center is part of the Georgia Department of Natural Resources, Wildlife Resources Division (Fisheries Management Section). The hours are Friday & Saturday from 9:00 am to 5:00 pm and Sunday from 1:00 pm to 5:00 pm.  The center is reserved Tuesday through Thursday for school field trips and other groups.

Perry Buzzard Drop 
The Buzzard drops in Perry each New Year's Eve with live entertainment, spirits sold on-site, a dance contest, and souvenir memorabilia.

Perry Area Historical Museum 
The Perry Area Historical Museum was founded to identify, protect and preserve the area's historical landmarks, artifacts, and histories of its people. Exhibits include military, social, agricultural, fashion, education, and political memorabilia. Services offered by the museum include a heritage library of local and regional publications, records, documents, family histories, and other research material. Programs offered include guided tours, special events, kids programs, and activities. The hours are Tuesday through Thursday, from 10:00 am to 12:00 noon and 2:00 pm to 4:00 pm.  The museum is also open by appointment.

Perry Dogwood Festival 
The Dogwood Festival is held the second weekend of April each year in downtown Perry. For each festival, there is a pageant, 5k, arts & crafts sale, food vendors, kids zone, youth entertainment stage, dog dock-diving competitions, and a hot air balloon rally.

Other attractions 

 Historic Downtown Perry
 The Perry Players Community Theater
 Perry Historic Walking/Driving Tour
 Flat Creek Public Fishing Area
 Georgia Grown Trail 41/341
 Georgia National Rodeo
 Peaches to the Beaches Yard Sale
 Food Truck Fridays
 Merchant's Wine Tasting
 Georgia National Antique & Agriculture Show
 Small Business Saturday
 Perry's Festival of Trees

Demographics

2020 census

As of the 2020 United States census, there were 20,624 people, 6,242 households, and 4,160 families residing in the city.

2000 census
As of the census of 2000, there were 9,602 people, 3,720 households, and 2,574 families residing in the city. The racial makeup of the city was 59.53% White, 37.18% African American, 0.21% Native American, 1.25% Asian, 0.04% Pacific Islander, 0.90% from other races, and 0.90% from two or more races. Hispanic or Latino of any race were 1.85% of the population.

There were 3,720 households, out of which 32.8% had children under the age of 18 living with them, 45.2% were married couples living together, 19.7% had a female householder with no husband present, and 30.8% were non-families. 26.8% of all households were made up of individuals, and 10.3% had someone living alone who was 65 years of age or older.  The average household size was 2.50 and the average family size was 3.03.

In the city, the population was spread out, with 25.9% under the age of 18, 9.8% from 18 to 24, 30.1% from 25 to 44, 20.2% from 45 to 64, and 14.0% who were 65 years of age or older.  The median age was 35 years. For every 100 females, there were 89.9 males.  For every 100 females age 18 and over, there were 84.6 males.

The median income for a household in the city was $31,418, and the median income for a family was $38,480. Males had a median income of $35,870 versus $21,136 for females. The per capita income for the city was $18,266.  About 15.6% of families and 18.8% of the population were below the poverty line, including 24.4% of those under age 18 and 15.4% of those aged 65 or over.

Notable people
Ernest Greene, chillwave musician, known by his stage name Washed Out
Casey Hayward, cornerback for the Atlanta Falcons, and former Las Vegas Raiders, Los Angeles Chargers, Green Bay Packers, and Vanderbilt University football player
Courtney Hodges, General  and commander of the First United States Army during World War II
Willis Hunt, senior federal judge
Sam Nunn, former United States Senator
Michelle Nunn, daughter of Sam Nunn, born and partly raised there, later CEO of Points of Light and candidate for U.S. Senate
Sonny Perdue, United States Secretary of Agriculture and former Governor of Georgia
Deborah Roberts, correspondent for ABC News
Ron Simmons, WCW/WWE wrestler and former Florida State Seminoles football player
Dontarrious Thomas, former linebacker for the San Francisco 49ers also the Minnesota Vikings and former Auburn University Tigers football player. Now entrepreneur and owner of VooDoo Wing Company in Auburn, AL and Las Vegas, NV
Al Thornton, former NBA player for Los Angeles Clippers, Washington Wizards, also the Golden State Warriors and former Florida State Seminoles basketball standout.
 Richard Ray, former United States Representative.
 Admiral James Harrison Oliver, Director of Navy Intelligence during World War I, appointed by President Woodrow Wilson to be the first governor of the Virgin Islands
 Kanorris Davis, former Troy University Trojans linebacker and NFL New England Patriots safety/linebacker, currently a free agent

References

Bobbe Hickson Nelson, A Land So Dedicated: Houston County, Georgia ([Perry, Ga.], 1977)  OCLC 3597733.

External links

Cities in Georgia (U.S. state)
Cities in Houston County, Georgia
Cities in Peach County, Georgia
County seats in Georgia (U.S. state)